The Saint Paul Fire Department provides fire protection and emergency medical services to the city of Saint Paul, Minnesota.

Stations and apparatus
The Saint Paul Fire Department operates out of 15 Fire Stations, located throughout the city in 3 Districts, under the command of 3 District Chiefs and a Deputy Chief each shift. The department currently  operates a fire apparatus fleet of 15 Engine Companies, 7 Ladder Companies, 3 Rescue Squad Companies, 15 Paramedic Ambulances, 3 Basic Life Support (BLS) Ambulances, 3 District Chief Units, 1 Arson Unit and numerous special, support, and reserve units. Minimum staffing is four members (typically two firefighter/paramedics and two firefighter/EMTs) for engine companies and ladder companies and five members for rescue squads. There are three “supermedic"  companies in the Saint Paul Fire Department (Ladder 7/Medic 7, Engine 8/Medic 8, and Engine 9/Medic 9); These companies are dedicated Emergency Medical Services response units which have dedicated staff for each company with two dedicated personnel on the medic units and four dedicated personnel on the engine or truck. The 12 remaining Medic units are cross staffed with the four personnel assigned to the engine Companies from their respective stations. There are 15 Fire Stations in the Saint Paul Fire Department.

See also 

 List of arson damage during the George Floyd protests in Minneapolis–Saint Paul

References

Fire departments in Minnesota
Government of Saint Paul, Minnesota
Ambulance services in the United States